George Nēpia (25 April 1905 – 27 August 1986) was a New Zealand Māori rugby union and rugby league player. He is remembered as an exceptional full-back and one of the most famous Māori rugby players. He was inducted into the New Zealand Sports Hall of Fame in 1990. In 2004 he was selected as number 65 by the panel of the New Zealand's Top 100 History Makers television show.  Nēpia was featured in a set of postage stamps from the New Zealand post office in 1990. Historian Philippa Mein Smith described him as "New Zealand rugby's first superstar".

Early life

Nēpia was born in Wairoa, Hawkes Bay. While his birth certificate stated that Nēpia was born in 1905, he later claimed to have been born in 1908. (Furthermore, in a 1924 passport application, he claimed that he was born on July 25, 1904, in Nūhaka, east of Wairoa.)  After finishing primary school in Nūhaka, Nēpia was to attend Te Aute College but went to the nearby Maori Agricultural College instead.

In 1926, Nēpia married Huinga Kōhere. They had four children, three sons and a daughter. Nēpia and his family settled on a dairy farm on land given by Kōhere's family at Rangitukia on the East Coast.

Rugby football career 
Nēpia was selected for the Hawkes Bay provincial rugby team in 1922. At that time Hawkes Bay had one of the strongest teams in New Zealand and held the Ranfurly Shield. Nēpia initially played on the wing but was later shifted to second-five eighth.

In 1924 Nēpia was selected as a full-back for the All Blacks tour to the United Kingdom. Nēpia was one of the stars of the tour. He played in all 32 games – being the only player to do so – and scored 77 points. As the team did not lose any matches, they came to be known as The Invincibles. Nēpia was a fine full-back, with a safe pair of hands, a strong kicking game and a fierce tackle. Before games on the tour, he led the team's performance of a haka that had been composed for the tour.

Nēpia was omitted from the 1928 All Blacks tour of South Africa, probably on racial grounds. Nēpia returned to the All Blacks for tours to Australia in 1929 and against the British Lions in New Zealand in 1930. These were his last games for the All Blacks. 

In 1935 Nēpia went to England to play rugby league professionally being signed initially by Streatham and Mitcham Rugby League Club in London for £500. His family remained in New Zealand. Because rugby union was a strictly amateur game at the time, Nēpia was cast out from rugby union. Nēpia later transferred to Halifax. In 1937 he returned to New Zealand and played league for Manukau and played for the New Zealand Māori and New Zealand rugby league team. During July and August 1937 Nēpia traveled to the South Island, representing both Hornby and Canterbury.

Later life 

Following his retirement from playing rugby Nēpia became a referee and worked as a farm manager in the Wairoa district. In 1975 his wife Huinga died. Nēpia lived out his final years with his son Winston in Rangitukia. He died in 1986.

References

External links 

 

1905 births
1986 deaths
Canterbury rugby league team players
Dominion XIII rugby league team players
Dual-code rugby internationals
East Coast rugby union players
Halbert-Kohere family
Halifax R.L.F.C. players
Hawke's Bay rugby union players
Hornby Panthers players
Manukau Magpies players
Māori All Blacks players
New Zealand international rugby union players
New Zealand Māori rugby league players
New Zealand Māori rugby league team players
New Zealand national rugby league team players
Ngati Rakaipaaka people
People from Wairoa
Rugby league fullbacks
Rugby league players from Hawke's Bay Region
Rugby union players from the Hawke's Bay Region
Streatham and Mitcham R.L.F.C. players
World Rugby Hall of Fame inductees